Founded by Joe Assell, Mike Clinton and Clayton Cole in 1995, GOLFTEC is a golf instruction and club fitting company headquartered in Denver, Colorado. With more than 200 retail locations worldwide, GOLFTEC teaches more than one million lessons annually. Currently, it has locations in the United States, Canada, China, Japan, Singapore, and Hong Kong. GOLFTEC's mission statement is “To Help People Play Better Golf.”

History and overview 
In 1995, the company's first location was opened in Denver under the name Driving Obsession. Two years later, it was re-branded as GOLFTEC (Technique, Equipment, Conditioning) and added two new locations in the Chicago area. Since then, GOLFTEC opened more than 200 centers worldwide and became one of the top employers of PGA of America Professionals, as well as a leading provider of golf club fittings.

Approach to instruction
According to the GOLFTEC website, the company offers a variety of lesson packages designed to meet individual needs, budgets, and goals. Pricing varies by location and Coach. GOLFTEC lessons are taught one-on-one by Certified Personal Coaches in private, mostly indoor bays that utilize a variety of proprietary teaching technology. By using a completely fact-based approach to instruction that combines cutting-edge technology with expert golf professionals, GOLFTEC students on average drop seven strokes from their scores.

How students start
GOLFTEC recommends new students take a Swing Evaluation. During this 60-minute golf lesson, a certified GOLFTEC Coach discusses where the student's golf game is and where they would like it to be. The Coach quantifies the player's golf swing with Motion Measurement technology and video analysis to provide an in-depth assessment. With this information, the Coach recommends a customized lesson plan to help each individual student reach their stated goals.

Instruction process

 Motion Measurement – GOLFTEC attaches proprietary motion measurement sensors to the student's shoulders and hips to accurately gauge key body movements throughout the swing.
 Video Analysis – High-definition video is used to capture a student's swing. The video is overlaid with ball flight data from a launch monitor and each student's unique motion measurements as captured by the company's TECSWING software.
 Analysis and Review – The certified Coach analyzes the swing by combining information from motion measurement, video capture and the launch monitor to identify the key areas in need of improvement. They then work with the student to identify specific goals. 
 Game Plans/Lesson Packs – Based on the Swing Evaluation and with the student's goals and budget in mind, the Coach builds a custom game plan and/or lesson pack. The former combines traditional lessons, in-bay practice time and a TECFIT club fitting, whereas the latter only encompasses lessons.

TECFIT 
TECFIT is GOLFTEC’s custom club fitting system that matches optimal clubs to a student's swing. It uses launch monitor data to suggest club and shaft combinations that will benefit the student's style of swing, resulting in better performance on the golf course.

The proprietary service allows students to demo thousands of clubhead/shaft combinations to determine personal preference and best performance.

This unbiased process creates a precision match for each golfer, which means there is very little chance they will be unhappy with the results. TECFIT is extremely thorough. It uses 60 minutes to gather the data, generate recommendations and let the student make the final decision about purchasing clubs from GOLFTEC. It all starts with the coach talking with the player to learn what they want to achieve. This goes hand-in-hand with the coach knowing the player's game. But even if a player is not taking lessons from a GOLFTEC coach, they will ask about ball flight, physical limitations, brand preferences, goals, etc. 

Currently GOLFTEC offers clubs from Callaway Golf, Mizuno, PING, TaylorMade Golf and Titleist.

SwingTRU Motion Study 
In 2016, GOLFTEC launched its SwingTRU Motion Study, the most comprehensive study of the golf swing ever conducted. It includes detailed analysis of more than 13,000 golfers, from PGA Tour players to beginners, pinpointing specific positions throughout the swing that directly correlate to golf skill level.

The data is used in GOLFTEC lessons to significantly reinforce a student's understanding of how the body moves, and should move, within the golf swing. This study provides a factual resource and starting point for improvement. 

The initial study identified six key positions in the swing that directly correlate to handicap: 

 ·        Hip Sway – Top Position
 ·        Shoulder Tilt – Top Position
 ·        Hip Turn – Impact Position
 ·        Hip Sway – Impact Position
 ·        Shoulder Tilt – Impact Position
 ·        Shoulder Bend – Follow-through

Partnership with Golf Digest Online 
In May 2018, Golf Digest Online (GDO), the largest online / offline golf conglomerate in Japan, expanded its partnership with GOLFTEC. 

The agreement centered on GDO's US entity, GDO Sports, Inc. acquiring majority interest in GOLFTEC with plans to merge the strengths of both companies to further grow the business globally. Existing GOLFTEC leadership remained in place to drive expansion and operational excellence.

Publicly traded on the Tokyo Stock Exchange and with 550 employees, GDO previously held a minority stake in GOLFTEC, operating 10 franchised training centers in Japan since opening its first in the upscale Roppongi district of Tokyo in 2012.

On the partnership, Nobuya “Mike” Ishizaka, Chairman and CEO of GDO, stated: “We are connecting the world through golf and GOLFTEC’s global presence and effectiveness with students are tremendous assets to achieve this vision. Helping golfers around the globe to play better and enjoy the game is vital for the success of the golf industry, and so GOLFTEC will be an impactful addition to our group.”

References

Golf instruction
American companies established in 1995
1995 establishments in Colorado
Companies based in Denver